Ben Carter (born 23 January 2001) is a Welsh rugby union player who plays as a lock for United Rugby Championship side Dragons and the Wales national team.

Club career
Carter was named in the Dragons first-team squad for the 2020–21 Pro14. He made his Dragons debut in Round 4 of the 2020–21 Pro14 against Munster.

International 

Carter has captained Wales at both U18 and U19 level and represented the country at the 2020 U20 Six Nations. Following impressive displays for the Dragons, Carter was called up to the senior Wales squad for the 2021 Summer Internationals, despite still being young enough to play for the Under-20 side, with Wales coach Wayne Pivac comparing the young Carter to Wales captain Alun Wyn Jones. Carter made his debut in the 68-12 win over Canada in a performance that saw him named man of the match. Carter made his Six Nations debut on 5 February 2022 against Ireland, coming on as a second-half substitute for Will Rowlands.

References

2001 births
Living people
Dragons RFC players
English people of Welsh descent
Welsh rugby union players
Rugby union locks
Rugby union players from East Sussex
Wales international rugby union players